2009 Norwegian Football Cup Final was played between Molde FK and Aalesunds FK on 8 November 2009 on Ullevaal Stadion in Oslo, Norway. With both clubs hailing from Møre og Romsdal, the match was dubbed as a local derby between the league silver medalists from Molde and the pride of Ålesund, who ended up as number four from the bottom in the league.

Molde played their fifth cup final, having won in 1994 and 2005, while Aalesund played their first cup final and had the chance to win the club's first trophy ever. Molde's captain Daniel Berg Hestad was a part of both the 1994 and the 2005 winning teams, while Knut Dørum Lillebakk, Øyvind Gjerde and Marcus Andreasson became cup champions in 2005. Both Glenn Roberts and Fredrik Carlsen had the chance to win their second straight cup after winning it with Vålerenga in 2008.

Route to the final 

(TL) = Tippeligaen team
(D1) = 1. divisjon team
(D2) = 2. divisjon team
(D3) = 3. divisjon team

Match

Details

References

2009
Aalesunds FK matches
Molde FK matches
Football Cup
Norwegian Cup 2009 Final
Norwegian Football Cup Final
Sports competitions in Oslo
2000s in Oslo
Final